Ingøy Church is a parish church of the Church of Norway in Måsøy Municipality in Troms og Finnmark county, Norway. It is located in the village of Ingøy on the island of Ingøya. It is one of the churches for the Måsøy parish which is part of the Hammerfest prosti (deanery) in the Diocese of Nord-Hålogaland.

Like most other churches in Finnmark, Ingøy church was burned down by the Germans during the evacuation of Finnmark in 1944. The new, white church was built in a long church style in 1957 using plans drawn up by the architect Eyvind Moestue. The church seats about 120 people. The altarpiece was rescued when the old church was burning, and it now hangs behind the altar in the church. The subject is Jesus and his disciples at the Sea of Galilee when Jesus calms the storm. The picture was painted by Christian Sinding Larsen in 1930.

History
The earliest existing historical records of the church date back to the year 1589, but the church was probably built during the 14th century. By the early 1700s, the church was in poor condition. In 1709, the church was torn down and replaced with a new church that was completed in 1712 and consecrated in 1714.

By the mid-1700s, Ingøya's population had declined to just a few people and in 1747 the church in Ingøy was moved to Måsøya, where it was rebuilt as Måsøy Church. Ingøy had no church from 1747 until 1866 when a new church was constructed at Ingøy. This church was heavily damaged in a hurricane in the early 1880s and had it to be rebuilt in 1883. That church remained until it was burned down by the German forces when they retreated from Finnmark in 1944. The current church was built between 1956-1957.

See also
List of churches in Nord-Hålogaland

References

Måsøy
Churches in Finnmark
Wooden churches in Norway
20th-century Church of Norway church buildings
Churches completed in 1957
14th-century establishments in Norway
Long churches in Norway